Gus McNaughton (29 July 1881 – 18 November 1969), also known as Augustus Le Clerq and Augustus Howard,  was an English film actor. He appeared in 70 films between 1930 and 1947. He was born in London and died in Castor, Cambridgeshire. He is sometimes credited as Gus MacNaughton. He appeared on stage from 1899, as a juvenile comedian with the Fred Karno company, the influential British music hall troupe. In films, McNaughton was often cast as the "fast-talking sidekick", and he appeared in several popular George Formby comedies of the 1930s and 1940s. He also appeared twice for director Alfred Hitchcock in both Murder! (1930) and The 39 Steps (1935).

Filmography

 Comets (1930) - Himself
 Murder! (1930) - Tom Trewitt (uncredited)
 Children of Chance (1930) - H.K. Zinkwell
 Lucky Girl (1932) - Hudson E. Greener
 The Last Coupon (1932) - Lord Bedlington
 The Maid of the Mountains (1932) - General Malona
 His Wife's Mother (1932) - Joy
 Money Talks (1932) - Solly Sax, Impresario
 Radio Parade (1933) - Himself
 Leave It to Me (1933) - Baxter
 Heads We Go (1933) - Otis Dove
 Crime on the Hill (1933) - Collins
 Happy (1933) - Waller
 The Love Nest (1933) - Fox
 Their Night Out (1933) - Fred Simpson
 Seeing Is Believing (1934) - Geoffrey Cooper
 Master and Man (1934) - Blackmailer
 The Luck of a Sailor (1934) - Official
 There Goes Susie (1934) - Brammel
 Spring in the Air (1934) - Max
 Barnacle Bill (1935) - Jack Baron
 Invitation to the Waltz (1935) - Valet
 Royal Cavalcade (1935) - Workman
 The 39 Steps (1935) - Commercial Traveller #1
 Joy Ride (1935) - String
 The Crouching Beast (1935)
 Music Hath Charms (1935) - Goodwin
 Not So Dusty (1936) - Nobby Clark
 Keep Your Seats, Please (1936) - Max
 Southern Roses (1936) - Parker
 The Heirloom Mystery (1936) - Alfred Fisher
 You Must Get Married (1936) - Bosun
 Action for Slander (1937) - Tandy
 Busman's Holiday (1937) - Alf Green
 Strange Adventures of Mr. Smith (1937) - Will Smith / Black Patch
 Storm in a Teacup (1937) - Horace Skirving
 Keep Fit (1937) - Tom
 South Riding (1938) - Tadman
 Easy Riches (1938) - Joe Hicks
 The Divorce of Lady X (1938) - Waiter
 We're Going to Be Rich (1938) - Broderick
 You're the Doctor (1938) - Kemp
 Sidewalks of London (1938) - Arthur Smith
 The Citadel (1938) - Tom Evans (uncredited)
 Keep Smiling (1938) - Eddie Perkins (uncredited)
 Q Planes (1939) - Blenkinsop
 Trouble Brewing (1939) - Bill Pike
 I Killed the Count (1939) - Martin
 There Ain't No Justice (1939) - Alfie Norton
 What Would You Do, Chums? (1939) - Harry Piper
 Blind Folly (1940) - Professor Zozo
 All at Sea (1940) - Nobby
 That's the Ticket (1940) - Milkbar Monty
 Two for Danger (1940) - Braithwaite
 George and Margaret (1940) - Wolverton
 Old Bill and Son (1941) - Alf
 Facing the Music (1941) - Illusionist
 Jeannie (1941) - Angus Whitelaw
 South American George (1941) - George White
 Penn of Pennsylvania (1942) - Ship's Mate
 The Day Will Dawn (1942) - Army Sergeant
 Let the People Sing (1942) - Ketley
 Much Too Shy (1942) - Manager
 Rose of Tralee (1942) - Gleeson
 The Shipbuilders (1943) - Jim
 Demobbed (1944) - Capt. Gregson
 A Place of One's Own (1945) - P.C. Hargreaves
 The Trojan Brothers (1946) - Frank
 Here Comes the Sun (1946) - Barrett
 The Turners of Prospect Road (1947) - Knocker
 This Was a Woman (1948) - Vet Surgeon
 Feature Story (1949)

Theatre
 Darling, I Love You (1931)

References

External links

1881 births
1969 deaths
20th-century English male actors
English male film actors
British male comedy actors
Music hall performers
Male actors from London